Harlem is a 1943 Italian sports crime film directed by Carmine Gallone and starring Massimo Girotti, Amedeo Nazzari and Vivi Gioi. It was shot at the Cinecittà Studios in Rome. The film's sets were designed by the art director Guido Fiorini. The former world heavyweight champion Primo Carnera appears in a small role. It is also known by the alternative title of Knock Out.

It is noted for its anti-Americanism at a time when the two countries were at war. In postwar re-releases, Amedeo's final line was redubbed with a more positive view on life in the United States.

Synopsis
Tommaso Rossi, a young Italian goes to America to visit his elder brother Amedeo who has a business in the construction industry. He is discovered as a talented boxer after getting into a fight with a champion in a restaurant and flooring him. However his elder brother's business is wrecked and he is arrested for a crime he did not commit. Forced to fight in order to raise enough money to bail his brother, Tommaso is then told by a dying Amedeo to return to Italy as the American dream holds nothing for Italian American immigrants.

Cast

 Massimo Girotti as Tommaso Rossi 
 Amedeo Nazzari as Amedeo Rossi 
 Vivi Gioi as Muriel 
 Elisa Cegani as La donna del gangster 
 Osvaldo Valenti as Chris Sherman 
 Erminio Spalla as Franckie Battaglia, l'allenatore 
 Enrico Glori as Ben Farrell 
 Lodovico Longo: as Charlie Lamb, a black boxer
 Gianni Musy as Il piccolo Tony Rossi 
 Enrico Viarisio as Pat 
 Luigi Almirante as Barney Palmer 
 Greta Gonda as Milena Zvetcovic 
 Giuseppe Porelli as Il duca di Solimena 
 Mino Doro as Bill Black 
 Giovanni Grasso as Guardascione 
 Luigi Pavese as Joe Smith 
 Guglielmo Sinaz as Sinclair Roswell 
 Primo Carnera as Se stesso

References

Bibliography 
 Peter Bondanella & Federico Pacchioni. A History of Italian Cinema. Bloomsbury Publishing, 2017.

External links 
 

1943 films
Italian crime films
1943 crime films
1940s sports films
Italian boxing films
1940s Italian-language films
Films directed by Carmine Gallone
Italian black-and-white films
Films shot at Cinecittà Studios
Films set in New York City
1940s Italian films